Kanazawa Samuraiz is a professional basketball club based in Kanazawa, Ishikawa Prefecture, Japan. The club plays in the third division of the B.League, which is the 3rd tier of basketball in the country.

Team

Current roster

Notable players
 Gjio Bain
 Tony Bishop
 Denzel Bowles
 Marshall Brown
 Luke Evans (fr)
 Drilon Hajrizi
 Andre Murray ([tl])
 Gyno Pomare
 Kenneth Simms

Coaches
Yukinori Suzuki
Takeshi Hotta
Kenshiro Ametani

Arenas
Kanazawa City General Gymnasium
Ishikawa General Sports Center
Matto General Sports Park Gymnasium
Kaga City Sports Center
Nanao City Citizens Gymnasium
Shika Town General Gymnasium

References

External links
 

 
2015 establishments in Japan
Basketball teams established in 2015
Basketball teams in Japan
Sports teams in Ishikawa Prefecture